The following are the national records in track cycling in Macau, maintained by its national cycling federation, Macau Cycling Association.

Men

Women

References

Macau
records